James Schoonmaker may refer to:

James Martinus Schoonmaker (1842–1927), colonel during the American Civil War
JC Schoonmaker (2000–), American skier
Ding Schoonmaker (1933–), American sailor
SS Col. James M. Schoonmaker, freighter on the Great Lakes